Václav Kotal (born 2 October 1952) is a Czech former football player and current manager, currently in charge of Viktoria Žižkov. As a player, he spent ten seasons at Sparta Prague, playing 168 matches in the Czechoslovak First League and winning two Czechoslovak Cups.

He was announced as the new manager of Hradec Králové on 24 March 2009, replacing manager Oldřich Machala. In his first full season, the 2009–10 Czech 2. Liga, Kotal led Hradec Králové to the Czech 2. Liga title and therefore promotion to the top flight. In two seasons of the Czech First League, Hradec finished in 8th and 13th place. In 2012 Kotal moved to fellow Czech First League outfit FK Jablonec. He was sacked before the end of the 2012–13 season with the club lying in fifth place in the league after a 5–1 defeat against Slavia Prague. Kotal returned to management in September 2013 as the new manager of FC Zbrojovka Brno.

Honours

Player
 Sparta Prague
Czechoslovak Cup (2): 1975–76, 1979–80

Managerial
 Hradec Králové
Czech 2. Liga (1): 2009–10

 Sparta Prague
Czech Cup (1): 2019–20

References

External links
 Profile at idnes.cz 

1952 births
Living people
Czechoslovak footballers
AC Sparta Prague players
Czech football managers
Czech First League managers
FC Hradec Králové managers
FK Jablonec managers
FK Náchod-Deštné players
Association football forwards
FC Zbrojovka Brno managers
AC Sparta Prague managers
Czech footballers
People from Náchod
FC Hradec Králové players
Omonia Aradippou players
Sportspeople from the Hradec Králové Region
FK Viktoria Žižkov managers
Bohemian Football League managers